The 1989 Romanian Revolution was a revolution in Romania that resulted in the overthrow of the regime of Nicolae and Elena Ceaușescu.

Romanian Revolution may also refer to:
Wallachian uprising (1821)
Wallachian Revolution of 1848 
Moldavian Revolution of 1848
Romanian War of Independence
2015 Romanian protests, dubbed #Colectiv Revolution
King Michael's Coup